For People in Sorrow is an album by American percussionist Alex Cline performing a composition inspired by the Art Ensemble of Chicago's 1969 album People in Sorrow which was recorded live at the Angel City Jazz Festival in 2011 and released on the Cryptogramophone label.

Reception

The Allmusic review by Thom Jurek awarded the album 4½ stars out of 5, stating "For People in Sorrow is not only a fitting tribute to Mitchell, the work, the AEC, and AACM, but proves a new high-water mark for Cline in terms of discipline, openness, and vision". Writing for JazzTimes, Mike Shanley stated "This rendition makes for an intense listen that stands as both a singular statement and a salute to the composer".

Track listing

Disc One: CD
 "A Wild Thing" - 3:55
 "People in Sorrow" - 63:47

Disc Two: DVD  
 For People in Sorrow - 70:18

Personnel
Alex Cline - drums, percussion
Dan Clucas - cornet, flute
Oliver Lake - saxophone, flute
Vinny Golia - woodwinds
Jeff Gauthier - electric violin
Maggie Parkins - cello
G.E. Stinson - electric guitar, electronics
Zeena Parkins - harp
Myra Melford - piano, harmonium
Sister Dang Nghiem - chant, bell
Mark Dresser - bass 
Will Salmon - conductor 
Larry Ward - recitation 
Dwight Trible - voice

References

2013 live albums
Alex Cline live albums
Cryptogramophone Records live albums